The 1974–75 NBA season was the Lakers' 27th season in the NBA and 15th season in Los Angeles. The team finished with 30 wins and 52 losses. This was the first year that the Lakers missed the playoffs in Los Angeles, and the first year since 1958 that the Lakers failed to make the playoffs overall. This was also the first year they failed to win the Pacific Division.

Offseason

Draft picks

Roster

Regular season

Season standings

z – clinched division title
y – clinched division title
x – clinched playoff spot

Record vs. opponents

Awards and records
 Gail Goodrich, NBA All-Star Game
 Brian Winters, NBA All-Rookie Team 1st Team

References

Los Angeles
Los Angeles Lakers seasons
Los Angle
Los Angle